Marianne Mendt (née Krupicka; born 29 September 1945) is an Austrian jazz singer and actress, best known for her participation in the 1971 Eurovision Song Contest.

Early career 

Mendt trained as a jazz singer and toured as a singer and bass player, with group the Internationals, around Europe.  Back in Vienna she was noticed by talent-spotter Gerhard Bronner, who wrote for her the song "A Glock'n", which was used as the theme tune for a television drama and reached No. 12 when released as a single in 1970.
Marianne Mendt published several 'Austrian versions' of well-known jazz and pop songs like Mercy, Mercy, Mercy ("I kann net lang mit dir bös' sein"), Spinning Wheel ("A g'scheckert's Hutschpferd") and Aquarius/Let the Sunshine In ("Der Wasserkopf").

Eurovision Song Contest 

In 1971, Mendt was chosen by broadcaster ORF to represent Austria with the song "Musik" in the 16th Eurovision Song Contest, held in Dublin on 3 April. It marked Austria's return to Eurovision following a two-year absence.  "Musik" – the only song performed at Eurovision to date in the Viennese German dialect – was drawn as the show's opening song, and at the end of voting could only manage 16th place of the 18 entries, after a somewhat nervous and hesitant performance from Mendt.

Later career 

Mendt combined her singing career with acting in productions at the large Vienna theatres.  In the 1990s, Mendt's acting career came to the fore, notably in the role of Gitti Schimek in TV drama Kaisermühlen Blues which ran from 1992 until 2000.

Mendt remains an active performer, regularly appearing at concerts and jazz festivals in Austria.

References

External links 
 Marianne Mendt website

1945 births
Living people
Eurovision Song Contest entrants for Austria
20th-century Austrian women singers
Austrian television actresses
Eurovision Song Contest entrants of 1971
Musicians from Vienna
Actresses from Vienna
20th-century Austrian actresses